Mexentypesa is a genus of spiders in the family Nemesiidae. It was first described in 1987 by Raven. , it contains only one species, Mexentypesa chiapas, from Mexico.

References

Nemesiidae
Monotypic Mygalomorphae genera
Spiders of Mexico